Booth Peninsula is a rocky peninsula,  long and  wide, of Antarctica, which projects west from the coast  southwest of Remenchus Glacier. It was mapped from aerial photographs taken by U.S. Navy Operation Highjump, 1946–47, and named by the Advisory Committee on Antarctic Names for George H. Booth, an air crewman on the Operation Highjump seaplane commanded by D.E. Bunger which landed in this area and obtained aerial and ground photographs of this ice-free region.

References 

Peninsulas of Antarctica
Landforms of Wilkes Land